The First Tape Album is a part-studio, part-live cassette-only album released by English neo-progressive band Twelfth Night in 1980.

Details
The First Tape Album was the first by the band with the classically trained keyboard Rick Battersby, who was an old friend of the band (he had helped them with dry ice for their first band contest appearance). Twelfth Night was the first band he joined. His inclusion made the music fuller and more adventurous.

The studio tracks ("Freddie Hepburn" and "Sequences") were recorded at Multium Studios, in Wokingham, England, in December 1979. "Fur Helene Part 1" was recorded live in concert at Reading University on 13 November 1979 and "Encore Une Fois"  at The Bridge House, Bracknell, on 12 April 1980.

The album has been reissued twice, in the 1980s with three extra (and exclusive) tracks, and again in the 1990s with two tracks from the Skan demos.

The Cyclops re-issue of Live at the Target contains "Encore Une Fois" and "Freddie Hepburn" from this album.

Track listing
All songs written by Twelfth Night.
 (Hats Off To) Freddie Hepburn (8:54)  
 Encore Une Fois (6:28)
 Sequences (17:40)  
 Für Helene Part I (5:14)

The First Tape Album Plus
rereleased c. 1983 with the following tracks
 Für Helene Part I (5:14) as above
 Encore Une Fois (6:28) as above
 (Hats Off To) Freddie Hepburn (8:54) as above
 Für Helene Part II (3:46) ... The Bridge House, Bracknell, 12 April 1980 
 Encore Une Fois / World Without End (6:55) ... The Target, Reading, 21 November 1980
 The Cunning Man (6:13) ... Reading University, 27 June 1980
 Sequences (17:40) as above

The First Tape Album Plus 
rereleased c. 1993 with the following tracks
 (Hats Off To) Freddie Hepburn (8:54) as above
 Encore Une Fois (6:28) as above
 Sequences (17:40) as above
 Für Helene Part I (5:14) as above
 Four and Three (5:30) ... Reading University, Reading, March 1979
 Für Helene Part I (14:00) ... Reading University, Reading, March 1979

Personnel
Brian Devoil drums, percussion 
Clive Mitten bass guitar, keyboards, classical guitar 
Andy Revell electric and acoustic guitar
Rick Battersby keyboards

References

1980 albums
Twelfth Night (band) albums